Samsonavank Monastery (Armenian: Սամսոնավանք) is a 12th-13th century monastery easiest reached via Yenokavan in the Tavush Province of northern Armenia. It is a small monastic complex that is located in a forested area along the slopes of a mountain approximately 6 km to the south of Deghdznuti Vank of the 13th century and not far from the medieval fort of Berdakar.

Complex 
The site consists of a small domed 12th- or 13th-century church, a shrine, and another small church. Finished stones used in the construction of Samsoni Vank have eroded due to rain.

References

External links
 Armeniapedia.org: Samsoni Vank

Armenian Apostolic churches in Armenia
Armenian Apostolic monasteries
Tourist attractions in Tavush Province
Buildings and structures in Tavush Province